Pyrausta purpuralis is a species of moth of the family Crambidae. It was described by Carl Linnaeus in his 1758 10th edition of Systema Naturae and is found in Europe. The species closely resembles Pyrausta aurata and Pyrausta ostrinalis. It is also known by the common name Common Purple & Gold.

The wingspan is about 20 mm. The forewings are purple, more or less mixed with dark grey; markings ochreous yellow, black-edged; an oblique fascia near base, not reaching costa; a spot in middle of disc; an irregular postmedian fascia, sometimes broken into three spots; sometimes a subterminal streak, not reaching apex. Hindwings are  black, base sometimes suffused with whitish-ochreous; a discal spot and curved postmedian fascia whitish-ochreous; sometimes a whitish-ochreous subterminal streak, sometimes purple in middle. The larva is dark grey; dorsal and spiracular lines yellowish; spots black, whitish-edged.

The moth flies from May to September depending on the location. The species is active during the day.

The larvae feed on mint.

References

External links

Pyrausta purpuralis at UKMoths
Lepidoptera of Belgium
Lepiforum.de

purpuralis
Moths described in 1758
Moths of Europe
Taxa named by Carl Linnaeus